Jörg Lucke (born 7 January 1942) is a retired East German rower. He won a bronze medal in the eights at the 1966 World Championships and an Olympic gold medal in the coxless pairs in 1968. After that he competed in the coxed pairs with Wolfgang Gunkel. Together they won the European title in 1971, the Olympics gold medal in 1972, and the world title in 1975, placing second in 1974.

References 

1942 births
Living people
Rowers from Berlin
Olympic rowers of East Germany
Rowers at the 1968 Summer Olympics
Rowers at the 1972 Summer Olympics
Olympic gold medalists for East Germany
Olympic medalists in rowing
East German male rowers
World Rowing Championships medalists for East Germany
Medalists at the 1972 Summer Olympics
Medalists at the 1968 Summer Olympics
European Rowing Championships medalists
20th-century German people